Paradiso (Italian: Heaven, literally: Paradise); may refer to:

People
 Paradiso (surname)

Places
 Gran Paradiso, a 4,000 metres mountain in Italy
 Paradiso railway station (Luxembourg)
 Paradiso, Switzerland, a municipality of the Italian-speaking canton of Ticino
 Lugano-Paradiso railway station
 Paradiso (Turin Metro), a Turin Metro station

Music
 Paradiso (Amsterdam), a music venue in Amsterdam
 Paradiso Festival, an annual music festival at the Gorge Amphitheatre in George, Washington, U.S.
 Paradiso Girls, an American and European dance-pop group

Albums
 Paradiso, a 2006 album by Tangerine Dream
 Paradiso, a 2017 album by Chino Amobi
 Paradiso (Fiction Plane album), 2009 
 Paradiso (Hayley Westenra album), 2011

Songs
 Paradiso, Connie Francis song Number-one hits of 1962 (Germany)
 "Paradiso" (Marika Gombitová song), a 1994 song by Marika Gombitová

Other uses
 Paradiso (Dante), the third part of Dante's Divine Comedy
 Paradiso (novel), a 1966 novel by Cuban writer José Lezama Lima

See also 

 Paradisio, a Belgian dance act 
 Paradiso (immersive theater experience), a theatrical experience in New York City
 Il Paradiso, oil painting on canvas by Jacopo Robusti
 Paradise (disambiguation)
 Paradis (disambiguation)